Agnes Aduako  (born 25 December 1989) is a Ghanaian footballer who plays as a forward for the Ghana women's national football team. She was part of the team at the 2014 African Women's Championship and at the 2015 African Games scoring a goal against Zimbabwe. At the club level, she played for Fabulous Ladies in Ghana.

International goals

See also
List of Ghana women's international footballers

References

1989 births
Living people
Ghanaian women's footballers
Ghana women's international footballers
Place of birth missing (living people)
Women's association football forwards
Fabulous Ladies F.C. players